Die Band, die sie Pferd nannten (pun on "Ein Mann, den sie Pferd nannten", the German title for: A Man Called Horse) is the fourth DVD by German rock band Die Ärzte. It was released as the DVD to the 2004 tour Jenseits der Grenze des Zumutbaren [Beyond The Border Of Reasonability], that promoted the album Geräusch.

Track listing 
DVD 1
 "Nicht allein" [Not alone]
 "2000 Mädchen" [2,000 Girls]
 "Richtig schön evil" [Really quite evil]
 "Hurra" [Hooray]
 "Geld" [Money]
 "Motherfucker 666"
 "Der Optimist" [The optimist]
 "Deine Schuld" [Your fault]
 "T-Error"
 "Mach die Augen zu" [Close your eyes]
 "Wie am ersten Tag" [Like on the first day]
 "Grace Kelly"
 "Nichts in der Welt" [Nothing in the world]
 "Anti-Zombie"
 "Geisterhaus" [Ghost house]
 "Alleine in der Nacht" [Alone in the night]
 "Die klügsten Männer der Welt" [The wisest men in the world]
 "Opfer" [Victim]
 "WAMMW" [Wenn alle Männer Mädchen wären - If all men were women]
 "Yoko Ono"
 "Bravopunks"
 "Rock-Rendezvous"
 "Ein Sommer nur für mich" [A summer just for me]
 "Die Nacht" [The night]
 "Kopfüber in die Hölle" [Headfirst into hell]
 "Wie es geht" [How it's done]
Bonus
 "Teenager Liebe" [Teenager love]
 "Du willst mich küssen" [You want to kiss me]
 "Rebell" [Rebel]

DVD 2
 "Dinge von denen" [Things of which]
 "Unrockbar" [Unrockable]
 "Meine " [My ex(ploded) girlfriend)]
 "Schrei nach Liebe" [Cry for love]
 "Langweilig" [Boring]
 Medley:
 "Ohne dich" [Without you]
 "Paul"
 "Quark" [Rubbish, lit. Curd]
 "Schunder-Song"
 "Meine Freunde" [My friends]
 "Nie wieder Krieg, nie wieder Las Vegas!" [No more war, no more Las Vegas!]
 "Rettet die Wale" [Save the whales]
 "Der lustige Astronaut" [The merry astronaut]
 "Las Vegas"
 "Monsterparty"
 "FaFaFa" (feat. Fettes Brot)
 "Ist das alles?" [Is that all?]
 "Manchmal haben Frauen..." [Sometimes, women have...]
 "Westerland"
 "Zu spät" [Too late]
Bonus
 "Komm zurück" [Come back]
 "Gib mir Zeit" [Give me time]
 "Angeber" [Show-off]

Song information 
DVD 1
Track 12 from the EP Zu schön, um wahr zu sein!
Tracks 11, 16 from the album Die Ärzte
Track 2 from the album Ist das alles? (13 Höhepunkte mit den Ärzten)
Track 10, 25 from the album Die Bestie in Menschengestalt
Tracks 4, 18 from the album Planet Punk
Track 6 from the album Le Frisur
Track 21 from the album 5, 6, 7, 8 – Bullenstaat!
Tracks 5, 7, 20, 22, 23, 26 from the album Runter mit den Spendierhosen, Unsichtbarer!
Tracks 1, 3, 8, 9, 13, 14, 15, 17, 24 from the album Geräusch
Track 19 is a B-side of the single "Nichts in der Welt"
Bonus
Track 1 from the EP Zu schön, um wahr zu sein!
Track 3 from the album 13
Track 2 from the album Runter mit den Spendierhosen, Unsichtbarer!

DVD 2
Track 6–8 from the EP Uns geht's prima...
Tracks 6–2, 12 from the album Debil
Track 9 from the album Die Ärzte
Tracks 6–1, 11 from the album Das ist nicht die ganze Wahrheit...
Tracks 4, 6–3, 8 from the album Die Bestie in Menschengestalt
Tracks 3, 5, 6–4 from the album Planet Punk
Tracks 6–5, 6–6 from the album 13
Tracks 6–9, 10 from the album Runter mit den Spendierhosen, Unsichtbarer!
Track 6–7 from the B-side from Manchmal haben Frauen...
Tracks 6, 7 from the album Rock'n'Roll Realschule
Tracks 1, 2 from the album Geräusch
Bonus
Track 1 from the album Das ist nicht die ganze Wahrheit...
Track 3 from the album 13
Track 2 from the album Runter mit den Spendierhosen, Unsichtbarer!

Certifications

Jenseits der Grenze des Zumutbaren 
The Jenseits der Grenze des Zumutbaren ("Behind the border of reasonability") was the 36th concert tour by German rock band Die Ärzte. The tour supported their tenth studio album, Geräusch (2003).

Tour dates

See also 
 Die Ärzte – Hören, sehen, sagen... nicht! – Die Lesetour (2001)
 Jazzfäst (2008)

References

Die Ärzte video albums
2004 video albums
Live video albums
2004 live albums